Dinitro-ortho-cresol (DNOC) is an organic compound with the structural formula CH3C6H2(NO2)2OH.  It is a yellow solid that is only slightly soluble in water. DNOC and some related derivatives have been used as herbicides.

Preparation
This compound is prepared by disulfonation of o-cresol. The resulting disulfonate is then treated with nitric acid to give DNOC. A variety of related derivatives are known including those where the methyl group is replaced by sec-butyl (dinoseb), tert-butyl (dinoterb), and 1-methylheptyl (dinocap). These are prepared by the direct nitration of the alkyphenols.

Applications and safety
This toxicant is an uncoupler, which means that it interferes with adenosine triphosphate (ATP) production. 

Symptoms of dinitro-ortho-cresol poisoning, due to ingestion or other forms of exposure, include confusion, headache, shortness of breath, and sweating.

References

External links
 World Health Organization
 CDC - NIOSH Pocket Guide to Chemical Hazards

Uncoupling agents
Nitrotoluenes
Cresols
Dinitrophenols